Kimstad is a locality situated in Norrköping Municipality, Östergötland County, Sweden with 1,510 inhabitants in 2010. On 12 September 2010, Kimstad became the scene of a railway accident when an X 2000 high-speed train collided with a crane utility vehicle. Kimstad lies around 20 kilometres southwest of Norrköping.

Riksdag elections

References 

Populated places in Östergötland County
Populated places in Norrköping Municipality